William McPherson or Macpherson may refer to:

William Macpherson (bureaucrat) (1784–1866), Clerk of the Legislative Council of New South Wales
William Macpherson (British Army officer) (1858–1927), colonel-commandant and author
William Macpherson (judge) (1926–2021), judge of the High Court of England and Wales and chair of the enquiry into the murder of Stephen Lawrence
William MacPherson (priest) (1901–1978), Anglican Dean of Lichfield
William Macpherson (cricketer), English cricketer
William McPherson (university president) (1864–1951), president of Ohio State University
William Murray McPherson (1865–1932), Australian philanthropist and politician
William McPherson Allen (1900–1985), American aircraft businessman
William McPherson (writer) (1933–2017), 1977 winner of the Pulitzer Prize for Criticism
William David McPherson (1863–1929), Ontario barrister and political figure

See also
Bill McPherson (disambiguation)